The Irrigation District Act of 1916'' (Irrigation Smith Act''') authorized the federal government to serve as the guarantor of debt obligations entered into by local governments to finance the acquisition, extension, or operation of irrigation, drainage, and flood control projects or to develop power generation facilities or water resources.

It was sponsored by Senator Hoke Smith, Democrat of Georgia, a former Secretary of the Interior.

States had served localities in a similar fashion and provided the model for the federal legislation. California's Irrigation District Act dated from 1887 and Colorado's from 1905.

See also 
 Canal
 Irrigation district
 List of canals in the United States
 Water district
 Irrigation canals

References 

United States federal agriculture legislation
Irrigation Districts of the United States